J. J. Hill may refer to:
 James John Hill (1811–1882), English landscape and portrait painter
 James Jerome Hill (1838–1916), Canadian-American railroad executive
 John James Hill (1853–1932), English stonemason and builder in the United States

See also 
 J. Hill, American music arranger
 Hill (surname)#J